Horacio Castellanos Moya (born 1957) is a Salvadoran novelist, short story writer, and journalist.

Life and work
Castellanos Moya was born in 1957 in Tegucigalpa, Honduras to a Honduran mother and a Salvadoran father. His family moved to El Salvador when he was four years old. He lived there until 1979 when he left to attend York University in Toronto.

On a visit home, he witnessed a demonstration of unarmed students and workers in which twenty-one people were killed by government snipers. He left El Salvador that March, but did not go back to Canada for school. Instead, he traveled to Costa Rica and Mexico, where he found work as a journalist. He wrote sympathetically about the Farabundo Marti National Liberation Front, a political party that formed following the 1932 Salvadoran peasant massacre. He soon, however, grew disillusioned by violent fighting within the party.

In 1991 Castellanos Moya returned to El Salvador to write for a monthly cultural magazine, Tendencias. In 1995 he contributed to the founding of the weekly publication Primera Plana and worked there until 1996. Over the next few years he wrote and published several novels, including Senselessness, The She-Devil in the Mirror, and Revulsion: Thomas Bernhard in San Salvador. The protagonist in Revulsion is a Thomas Bernhard-esque character who returns to El Salvador after eighteen years to deliver a 119-page diatribe against the country. The novel enraged some Salvadorans with some calling for a book ban and others throwing the book into fires. Castellanos Moya’s mother received death threats against her son and in 1997 Castellanos Moya fled El Salvador.

Starting in 2002 he lived in Mexico City in self-imposed exile for ten years. He began writing a new novel called Guatemale: Nunca mas! (Never Again!). It was published as Insensatez in 2004. In 2008 the novel became his first work to be translated into English.

Castellanos Moya was granted residencies in a program supported by the Frankfurt International Book Fair (2004-2006) and as a Writer-in-Residence at City of Asylum/Pittsburgh (2006-2008). In 2009, he was a guest researcher at the University of Tokyo. Currently he teaches at the University of Iowa and is a regular columnist for Sampsonia Way Magazine where he "looks for topics that open debates, new perspectives, and controversy."

His first novel, La diáspora, which concerns the struggles of the exiles from the Salvadoran Civil War, won the Premio Nacional de la Novela, awarded by the Universidad Centroamericana "José Simeón Cañas", in 1988.

In 2014 he received Chile's Manuel Rojas Ibero-American Narrative Award.

Bibliography
 La diáspora, 1988 (Novel)
 ¿Qué signo es usted, Doña Berta?, 1982 (Short stories)
 Perfil de prófugo, 1987 (Short stories)
 El gran masturbador, 1993 (Short stories)
 Con la congoja de la pasada tormenta, 1995 (Short stories)
 Recuento de incertidumbres: cultura y transición en El Salvador, 1995 (Essay)
 Baile con serpientes, 1996 (Dance with Snakes, English translation by Lee Paula Springer published by Biblioasis 2009) (Novel)
 El asco, Thomas Bernhard en San Salvador, 1997 (Revulsion: Thomas Bernhard in San Salvador, English translation by Lee Klein published by New Directions 2016)  (Novel)
 La diabla en el espejo, 2000 (She-Devil in the Mirror, English translation by Katherine Silver published by New Directions 2009) (Novel, Finalist Rómulo Gallegos Award)
 El arma en el hombre, 2001 (Novel)
 Donde no estén ustedes, 2003 (Novel)
 Indolencia, 2004 (Short stories)
 Insensatez, 2004 (Senselessness, English translation by Katherine Silver published by New Directions 2008) (Novel)
 Desmoronamiento, 2006 (Novel)
 Tirana memoria, 2008 (Tyrant Memory, English translation by Katherine Silver published by New Directions 2011) (Novel)
 La sirvienta y el luchador, 2011 (Novel)
 El sueño del retorno, 2013 (The Dream of My Return, English translation by Katherine Silver published by New Directions 2015) (Novel)

References

External links
 Horacio Castellanos and the New Political Novel The Quarterly Conversation, Issue 17
 Horacio Castellanos Moya Interview The Quarterly Conversation
 Bolano, Inc. Guernica
 Moya Sees Through Left and Right The New York Review of Books
 Corkscrew, Horacio Castellanos Moya's column at Sampsonia Way Magazine
 Horacio Castellanos Moya se suma a Rubem Fonseca y Ricardo Piglia al recibir premio Iberoamericano

1957 births
Salvadoran novelists
Salvadoran male writers
Male novelists
Salvadoran short story writers
Male short story writers
Living people
Salvadoran emigrants to Canada
Honduran emigrants to El Salvador
Salvadoran people of Honduran descent
20th-century Salvadoran writers
21st-century Salvadoran writers